9 Toes Later is the debut release from American punk band the Undead. Glenn Danzig of the Misfits helped finance the EP. It was originally released June 25, 1982, on Stiff Records, in an edition of 1,995 copies. It was re-released in 1983 on Rosemary's Babies bassist Post Mortem's own record label, Post Mortem Records. 1,000 copies were pressed of this version. Three early test pressings were also made, all of them owned by Bobby Steele. 

One of Steele's toes was amputated around the time of the recording, thus providing the EP title.

Track listing
 "A Life of Our Own" (Bobby Steele/Dave Street)
 "My Kinda Town" (Steele)
 "When the Evening Comes" (Steele)
 "I Want You Dead" (Steele)

Personnel 
 Bobby Steele – guitar, vocals
 Chris Natz – bass
 Patrick Blanck – drums
 Jimi Quidd – producer
 Recorded at Mix-O-Lydian, 08//1981

References

The Undead albums
1982 debut EPs
Stiff Records EPs
Horror punk EPs